Julie Hamos (born January 29, 1949) is a former Democratic member of the Illinois House of Representatives, representing the 18th District from 1999 to 2010. Her district included Rogers Park in Chicago and the suburbs of Evanston, Wilmette, Kenilworth, Winnetka and Glencoe.

Early life
Born in Budapest, Hungary, the seven-year-old Julie, her brother and parents escaped at the height of the Hungarian Revolution in 1956. She grew up in Cleveland, Ohio.  After receiving her law degree in 1975 from George Washington University, Hamos became the first staff attorney for a newly formed subcommittee of the powerful U.S. House Committee on Ways and Means. Later she became legislative and political action director for the American Federation of State, County and Municipal Employees, working on policy issues affecting working men and women. From 1981 to 1984, Hamos served as legislative counsel and policy advisor to then-State's Attorney Richard M. Daley, advocating for the first-ever laws and policies on domestic violence and sexual assault. She was appointed in 1984 as director of the child support division, with oversight of 300,000 child support cases. In 1988, Hamos founded Julie E. Hamos & Associates, a public policy and community relations consulting firm. Hamos lives in Chicago with her husband, Alan J. Greiman, a retired appellate court judge.

Illinois House of Representatives

In 1998, incumbent Jan Schakowsky ran for the United States House of Representatives in Illinois's 9th congressional district. Hamos was elected her successor. She took office December 31, 1998. In June 2004, Hamos was selected as a fellow at the John F. Kennedy School of Government for Senior Executives in State and Local Government.

Congressional campaign 
In July 2009, Hamos declared her candidacy for the U.S. House of Representatives in Illinois’ 10th congressional district, but lost to Dan Seals in the Democratic primary in February 2010. In April 2010, she was appointed by Governor Pat Quinn to be the new director of the Illinois Department of Healthcare and Family Services, the agency that oversees the Illinois Medicaid program.

Illinois Department of Healthcare and Family Services 
Hamos led the Department of Healthcare and Family Services (HFS) until January 9, 2015, when she resigned before incoming, newly-elected Governor Bruce Rauner took office.  During her tenure at HFS—Illinois' largest state agency—she guided the expansion of managed care in the Illinois Medicaid program, the expansion of coverage under President Barack Obama's health care law and upgraded technology systems. She also implemented child support initiatives "such as working with fathers on parenting, making child support information available on cell phone and intercepting gambling winnings at casinos."

References

External links

Illinois General Assembly - Representative Julie Hamos (D) 18th District official IL House website
Bills Committees
 
Follow the Money - Julie Hamos
2008 2006 2004 2002 2000 1998 campaign contributions
Illinois House Democrats - Julie Hamos profile

1949 births
Living people
American people of Hungarian-Jewish descent
George Washington University Law School alumni
Hungarian emigrants to the United States
Hungarian Jews
Jewish American state legislators in Illinois
Harvard Kennedy School staff
Democratic Party members of the Illinois House of Representatives
Women state legislators in Illinois
21st-century American politicians
21st-century American women politicians
American Federation of State, County and Municipal Employees people
Candidates in the 2010 United States elections
20th-century American politicians
20th-century American women politicians